Sociedad Deportiva Panamá Oeste is a Panamanian football team playing at the Liga Nacional de Ascenso.

It is based in Arraiján. Up until 2011, the team was known as Chorrillito Fútbol Club de Arraiján.

History

Chorrillito F.C.

In 2007 Chorrillito promoted to the Liga Nacional de Ascenso after defeating Five Star 4–2 in the Copa Rommel Fernández final. In its first season in the Liga Nacional de Ascenso in 2008, Chorrillito managed to reach both the Apertura and Clausura finals but lost in both cases against Orión and Río Abajo respectively.

S.D. Panamá Oeste
For the Clausura championship of the 2010-11 Liga Nacional de Ascenso season Chorrillito changed its name to Sociedad Deportiva Panamá Oeste. In that season they reached the quarterfinal stage of the championship after finishing 3rd in their group (Group B), however they were defeated by SUNTRACS on a 3–0 aggregate score.

Honours
Copa Rommel Fernández: 1
2007

Year-by-year results

Liga Nacional de Ascenso

References

Football clubs in Panama